Tosu is a moribund Qiangic language of China which shows strong affiliations to both the Loloish languages and to Tangut, the language of the Western Xia. Yu (2012) classifies it as an Ersuic language, which belongs to the Qiangic branch. There are "almost no Tosu speakers left", or "practically" no Ersu speakers left.

About 2,000 Tosu people live in Miǎnníng county and the villages around it, as well as in six outlying townships of that county, namely Hòushān (后山), Fùxīng (复兴), Huì’ān (惠安), Hāhā (哈哈), Línlǐ (林里), and Shābā town (沙坝镇). Chirkova (2014) reports that it is spoken by more than 9 individuals, all in their seventies and eighties.

References

Bibliography

 Yu, Dominic. 2012. Proto-Ersuic. Ph.D. dissertation. Berkeley: University of California, Berkeley, Department of Linguistics.

 Nishida, Tatsuo, 1973, 多続訳語の研究 : 新言語トス語の構造と系統 [A Study of the Tosu–Chinese Vocabulary Tosu I-yu: the structure and lineage of Tosu, a new language], 松香堂 Shokado, Kyoto 
 Nishida, Tatsuo, 1975, "Hsi-hsia, Tosu, and Lolo–Burmese", Sino-Tibetan Conference VIII, Berkeley
 Nishida, Tatsuo, 1976, "Hsi-hsia, Tosu, and Lolo–Burmese languages", Studia Phonologica 10:1–15

External links
 ELAR archive of Duoxu language documentation materials

Qiangic languages
Tanguts
Endangered Sino-Tibetan languages
Extinct languages of Asia